Push the Button is the second studio album by American musician Money Mark, originally released on the Mo' Wax label in 1998. It peaked at number 17 on the UK Albums Chart.

"Hand in Your Head" and "Maybe I'm Dead" were released as singles, the former reaching number 40 and the latter reaching number 45 on the UK Singles Chart.

Track listing

Personnel
Credits adapted from liner notes.

Musicians
 Mark Ramos-Nishita – vocals, keyboards, guitar
 Sean Lennon – bass guitar
 Russell Simins – drums
 Alfredo Ortiz – drums (4)
 Hutch Hutchinson – bass guitar (7)
 Jim Keltner – drums (7, 11)
 Al McKibbon – bass guitar (8)
 Rocco Bidlovski – drums (8)
 Stuart Wylen – flute (8)
 Eric Bobo – percussion (8)
 Craig Fundinga – vibraphone (8)
 Tony McDaniel – bass guitar (11)

Technical
 Mark Ramos-Nishita – production (1, 4-7, 9, 10, 12-18)
 Mario Caldato Jr. – production (1-4, 7, 8, 11, 13)
 Craig Silvey – additional production (4, 15-18)
 Jim Abbiss – additional production (9)
 Ben Drury – design, button photography
 Tamra Davis – Money Mark photography
 James Lavelle – A&R
 Robert Bennett – management

Charts

References

External links
 

1998 albums
Money Mark albums
Mo' Wax albums
Grand Royal albums
London Records albums